Frépillon is a commune in the Val-d'Oise department and Île-de-France region of France. Frépillon station has rail connections to Persan, Saint-Leu-la-Forêt and Paris.

See also
Communes of the Val-d'Oise department

References

External links
Official website 
Association of Mayors of the Val d'Oise 

Communes of Val-d'Oise